Yellowhead or Yellow Head may refer to:

Places
In Canada
Yellowhead Highway in Western Canada
Yellowhead Trail, Edmonton, Alberta
Yellowhead County, Alberta
Yellowhead (electoral district), Alberta
Grande Yellowhead Public School Division No. 77, Alberta
Rural Municipality of Yellowhead, Manitoba
Tête Jaune Cache, British Columbia 
West Yellowhead (electoral district), Alberta
Yellowhead Centre, Neepawa, Manitoba
Yellowhead Lake, British Columbia
Yellowhead Mountain, Alberta and British Columbia
Yellowhead Pass mountain pass and National Historic Site, Alberta and British Columbia
Yellowhead Power Station, natural gas fired electrical station in Saskatchewan, Canada
In the United States
Yellow Head, Maine, a village in Lincoln County, Maine
Yellowhead Township, Kankakee County, Illinois

People 
 Ozaawindib, a 19th-century Ojibwa warrior 
 Ozaawindib (Chippewa chief), a 19th-century Ojibwa chief for the Prairie Rice Lake Band of Lake Superior Chippewa Indians
 Ozaawindib (Mille Lacs chief), a chief of the Mille Lacs Indians
 Tête Jaune aka. Pierre Bostonais aka. Pierre Hastination, trapper and explorer of Western Canada
 Yellowhead, an audiovisual artist, music producer and the founder of 56 Stuff music label

Organisms
Yellowhead (bird)
Yellowhead disease
Yellowhead jawfish
Yellowhead butterflyfish
Inula, plants in the daisy family
Trichoptilium, plants in the daisy family
Zanthoxylum flavum, a citrus plant

Other uses
Yellowhead (film), a 2013 Canadian short film
Pimple, colloquially known as a yellowhead when without a blackhead